South Korea participated in the 2018 Asian Games in Jakarta and Palembang, Indonesia from 18 August to 2 September 2018. It was the 18th appearance of the country at the Asian Games, except the first edition in Delhi. As one of the best competitors at the Games, South Korea's best achievement was in the 2002 Busan, with the acquisition of 96 gold, 80 silver and 84 bronze medals. At the latest edition in 2014 Incheon, the country had collected 79 gold, 71 silver, and 84 bronze medals.

South Korea sent 779 athletes across 39 sports to compete in Jakarta and Palembang. Korean Sport & Olympic Committee (KOC) is aiming to finish second for the sixth consecutive Asian Games with 65 gold medals, fewer than the Incheon Asian Games four years ago. South Korea marched along with North Korea under the Korean Unification Flag at the opening ceremony, and have together fielded unified Korean teams in women's basketball, rowing and canoeing.

Medalists 
The following South Korean competitors won medals at the Games. In the by discipline sections below, medalists' names are bolded.

Demonstration events

Competitors 
The following is a list of the number of competitors representing South Korea that participated at the Games:

Demonstration events

Archery

Recurve

* Oh Jin-hyek and Kang Chae-young took part in the ranking round.

Compound

** Did not play.
*** Choi Yong-hee and So Chae-won took part in the ranking round.

Artistic swimming 

FR: Reserved in free routine; RR: Reserved in technical and free routines; TR: Reserved in technical routine.

Athletics

Track

* Did not play.

Road

Field

Combined

Badminton 

Men

Women

Mixed

Baseball

The following is the South Korea roster for the men's baseball tournament of the 2018 Asian Games. The team of 24 players was officially named on 11 June 2018.

Round 2 – Group B

Super round

Final

Basketball

5x5 basketball
As the defending champion, South Korea men's team drawn in the group A at the competition.

Men's tournament

Roster
The following is the South Korea roster in the men's basketball tournament of the 2018 Asian Games.

Group A

Quarterfinal

Semifinal

Bronze medal match

3x3 basketball
South Korea also set a men's and women's team that competed in the 3-on-3 basketball. The men's team placed in the pool B, and the women's team in the pool D based on the FIBA 3x3 federation ranking.

Men's tournament

Roster
Korea Basketball Association (KBA) selected four athletes for the men's 3x3 basketball tournament of the 2018 Asian Games.
An Young-jun
Yang Hong-seok
Kim Nak-hyeon
Park In-tae

Pool B

Quarterfinal

Semifinal

Final

Women's tournament

Roster
The following is the South Korea roster in the women's 3x3 basketball tournament of the 2018 Asian Games.
Choi Gyu-hee
Kim Jin-yeong
Park Ji-eun
Kim Jin-hee

Pool D

Quarterfinal

Bowling 

Men

Women

Boxing 

Men

Women

Canoeing

Slalom

Sprint

Qualification legend: QF=Final; QS=Semifinal

Cycling

BMX

Mountain biking

Road

Track

Sprint

Team sprint

 Riders who participated in the heats only and received medals.
 Riders who entered the competition but did not participating in any phase of the team event.
Qualification legend: FA=Gold medal final; FB=Bronze medal final

Pursuit

 Riders who participated in the heats only and received medals.
 Riders who entered the competition but did not participating in any phase of the team event.
Qualification legend: FA=Gold medal final; FB=Bronze medal final

Keirin

Qualification legend: FA=Gold medal final; FB=Bronze medal final

Omnium

Madison

Diving 

Men

Women

Equestrian 

Dressage

Eventing

Jumping

 – indicates that the score of this rider does not count in the team competition, since only the best three results of a team are counted.

Esports (demonstration) 

StarCraft II

League of Legends

Fencing 

Individual

Team

Field hockey

Men's tournament

Team roster

Pool A

5th place match

Women's tournament

Team roster

Pool B

Semifinal

Bronze medal match

Football 

South Korea men's team were drawn in Group E at the Games, while the women's team in Group A.

Men's tournament

Roster

Group E

Round of 16

Quarterfinal

Semifinal

Final

Women's tournament

Roster

Group A

Quarterfinal

Semifinal

Bronze medal match

Golf 

Men

Women

Gymnastics

Handball 

South Korea men's team were drawn in group B, while the women's team in group A. The women's team was a champion in the last edition in 2014 Incheon.

Men's tournament

Preliminary round – Group B

Main round – Group II

Semifinal

Bronze medal match

Women's tournament

Group A

Semifinal

Final

Jet ski

Ju-jitsu 

South Korea entered the ju-jitsu competition with 1 men's and 1 women's athletes.

Men

Women

Judo 

Men

Women

Mixed

Kabaddi

Men's tournament

Team roster

Lee Dong-geon
Eom Tae-deok
Ok Yong-joo
Lee Jang-kun
Hong Dong-ju
Kim Dong-gyu
Park Chan-sik
Jo Jae-pil
Kim Seong-ryeol
Park Hyun-il
Kim Gyung-tae
Ko Young-chang

Group A

Semifinal

Final

Women's tournament

Team roster

Kim Ji-young
Kim Hee-jeong
Lee Hyun-jeong
Shin So-min
Pak Min-kyung
Park Ji-yi
Woo Hee-jun
Im Jae-won
Jo Hyun-a
Yoon Yu-ri
Hong Hye-min

Group B

Karate

Kurash 

Men

Women

Modern pentathlon 

South Korea entered four pentathletes (2 men's and 2 women's) at the Games.

Paragliding 

Men

Women

Roller sports

Skateboarding

Speed skating

Rowing 

Men

Women

Rugby sevens 

South Korea rugby sevens men's team entered the group C at the Games, while the women's team placed in group A.

Men's tournament 

Team squad
The following is the South Korea squad in the men's rugby sevens tournament of the 2018 Asian Games.

Head coach: Choi Chang-ryul

Chang Yong-heung
Han Kun-kyu
Hwang In-jo
Jang Jeong-min
Jang Seong-min
Kim Gwong-min
Kim Hyun-soo
Kim Jeong-min
Kim Jin-hyeok
Kim Nam-uk
Kim Sung-soo
Lee Jae-bok

Group C

Quarterfinal

Semifinal

Bronze medal match

Women's tournament 

Team squad
The following is the South Korea squad in the women's rugby sevens tournament of the 2018 Asian Games.

Head coach: Cho Sung-lyong

Baek Jie-un
Gwon Seul-gi
Heo Kyung-hee
Kim Yu-ri
Lee Min-hui
Lim Jae-won
Min Kyung-jin
Park Seong-bin
Park Su-ji
Seo Bo-hee
Shin Ye-lim
Yang Sol-hee

Group A

Quarterfinal

5th–8th place semifinal

7th place match

Sailing

Men

Women

Mixed

Sepak takraw 

Men

Women

Shooting 

Men

Women

Mixed team

Soft tennis

Softball 

Preliminary round

The top four teams will advance to the Final round.

Sport climbing 

Speed

Speed relay

Combined

Squash 

Singles

Team

Swimming

Freestyle

Backstroke

Breaststroke

Butterfly

Medley

Table tennis 

Individual

Team

Taekwondo 

Poomsae

Kyorugi

Tennis 

Men

Women

Mixed

Triathlon 

South Korea entered their triathletes to compete at the Games.

Individual

Mixed relay

Volleyball

Beach volleyball

Indoor volleyball

Men's tournament

Roster
The following is the South Korean roster in the men's volleyball tournament of the 2018 Asian Games.

Head coach: Kim Ho-chul

Pool D

Playoff

Quarterfinal

Semifinal

Final

Women's tournament

Roster
The following is the South Korean roster in the women's volleyball tournament of the 2018 Asian Games.

Head coach: Cha Hae-won

Pool B

Quarterfinal

Semifinal

Bronze medal match

Water polo

Men's tournament

Roster
Head coach: Kim Jung-yeoul

Lee Seung-hun (GK)
Park Jeong-min (CB)
Yoo Byeong-jin (D)
Lee Seo-nuk (D) (C)
Youn Young-gwan (CF)
Choi Jin-jae (D)
Kim Dong-hyeok (D)
Kim Moon-soo (D)
Chu Min-jong (D)
Han Hyo-min (D)
Gwon Dae-yong (D)
Lee Seong-gyu (D)
Jung Byeong-young (GK)

Group A

Quarterfinal

5th–8th place semifinal

5th place match

Weightlifting

Men

Women

Wrestling 

Men's freestyle

Men's Greco-Roman

Women's freestyle

Wushu 

Taolu

Sanda

eSports

See also
 South Korea at the 2018 Asian Para Games

References 

Nations at the 2018 Asian Games
2018
Asian Games